Zhu Jiawei (Chinese: 朱家伟; Pinyin: Zhū Jiāwěi, born 19 August 1990) is a Chinese football player.

Club career
Zhu joined Inter Shanghai youth team system with his countryman Rao Weihui in 2003 and was promoted to Shaanxi Chanba first team squad in 2008. On 17 May 2008, he made his senior debut aged 17 years and 271 days in a 2008 Chinese Super League match which Shaanxi Chanba tied with Dalian Shide 1–1. He scored his first senior goal on 13 October 2008, in a 3–0 home victory against Liaoning Whowin. On 26 May 2011, he scored the winning goal of the third round of 2011 Chinese FA Cup, which Shaanxi Chanba beat Liaoning whowin 1–0.

Zhu transferred to another Super League club Shanghai Shenxin in 2012. On 26 June 2012, he scored his first goal for Shenxin in the third round of 2012 Chinese FA Cup, however, he missed a penalty in the penalty shootout as Shanghai Shenxin lost to China League One side Shenyang Shenbei 6–4. He left Shanghai Shenxin at the end of 2014 season.

Career statistics

References

1990 births
Living people
People from Xingning
Hakka sportspeople
Association football midfielders
Chinese footballers
Footballers from Meizhou
Shanghai Shenxin F.C. players
Chinese Super League players